Xmind is a mind mapping and brainstorming software, It is developed by XMIND LTD, a company registered in Hong Kong, and first released in 2007. The application can be used to visualize ideas, clarify thoughts, manage complex information, and promote team collaboration. People use Xmind to improve their productivity and creativity while working or learning.  As of April 2013, Xmind was selected as the most popular mind mapping software on Lifehacker.

Xmind supports mind maps, logic charts, brace maps, organization charts, tree structure, timelines, fishbone diagrams, tree tables, and matrix. Normally, it is used by businesses and students for knowledge management, learning aid, meeting minutes, presentations, etc. The application offers various modes for distraction-free entry and smooth workflow. It is currently available on all platforms, including Windows, macOS, Linux, iOS/iPadOS, Android, and Web.

Editions
As of November 2022, there are two main licensing editions of Xmind, which are Xmind (current edition) and XMind 8 (legacy edition).
Xmind is a subscription-based edition, and it supports all platforms which is compatible with all types of ’’’.xmind’’’ files. 

XMind 8 is a legacy edition with a lifetime license available to purchase. The latest version of XMind 8 is compatible with all types of .xmind files as well.

Milestones

Eclipse-based application and open-sourced
Prior to XMind 8 (included), the application is based on Eclipse Rich Client Platform 3.4 for its shell and Eclipse Graphical Editing Framework for its core editors. It depends on Java Runtime Environment 5.0 and later.

Electron-based application
Start from XMind: Zen, the application had switched to Electron (software framework).

Awards
XMIND 2008 won the "Best Commercial RCP Application" award at EclipseCon 2008
XMIND 3 won  "The Best Project for Academia" award at SourceForge.net Community Choice Awards
XMIND was picked by PCWorld for inclusion in Productivity Software: Best of 2010
XMind 2013 was picked as "the Most Popular Mind Mapping Software" on Lifehacker
XMind won "Red Herring Asia Top 100"
XMind was rated as "The Best Brainstorming and Mind-Mapping Tech Tool" on lifehack
XMind was featured in Apple's App Store as "App of the Day" in March, 2018.

File format
Xmind saves content in an Xmind Workbook file format. The .xmind format suffix is used.

An Xmind workbook may contain more than one sheet, as in spreadsheet software. Each sheet may contain multiple topics, including one central topic, multiple main topics and multiple floating topics. Various structures can be inserted in one mind map, allowing the mind map to visualize information in different ways.

The latest .xmind file format implementing Xmind Workbooks consists of a ZIP compressed archive containing an JSON document for contents, a .png image file for thumbnails, and some directories for attachments. The file format is open and based on some principles of OpenDocument/OfficeOpenXML.

See also
Mind map
Brainstorming
List of concept- and mind-mapping software
Tony Buzan
Fishbone diagram
List of Eclipse-based software

References

External links

Concept- and mind-mapping software programmed in Java
Project management software
Proprietary commercial software for Linux
Mind-mapping software